Sagenopteris williamsii is an extinct pteridosperm (seed fern) that is known from the late Jurassic and Early Cretaceous strata of the western interior of North America. It was first described as Chiropteris williamsii by  J.S. Newberry in 1891, based on specimens from the Great Falls coal field in Montana. In 1956, it was referred to Sagenopteris by W.A. Bell based on additional specimens from western Canada.

Description 
Sagenopteris williamsii had four or more palmately arranged, ovate to obovate leaves, each up to 10 cm long and 10 cm wide. They had a petiole, anastomosing venation, and a midvein that thinned toward the apex.

Distribution and age
Leaves of S. williamsii have been reported (as Chiropteris williamsii) from the late Jurassic strata of the Morrison Formation in western Montana. In Canada, they are known from the Jurassic Hazelton Group of north-central British Columbia, the Early Cretaceous Blairmore and Luscar Groups of western Alberta, and the Early Cretaceous Bullhead Group of northeastern British Columbia.

References

Pteridospermatophyta
Jurassic plants
Early Cretaceous plants
Fossil record of plants
Mesozoic life of North America
Prehistoric plants of North America
Jurassic Canada
Jurassic United States